Hilary Duff: All Access Pass, commonly referred to as All Access Pass, is the first video album by American recording artist Hilary Duff, released on November 4, 2003 by Buena Vista and Hollywood Records. Directed and produced by Virgil P. and Tess Gallagher Thompson, the hour-long DVD features the music videos for Duff's songs "So Yesterday", "Why Not" and "I Can't Wait". All Access Pass also features behind-the-scenes videos of the former two music videos and her second studio album Metamorphosis (2003), and a live performance from Duff at Sessions@AOL. Duff has stated that the DVD also documents her two-year musical journey leading up to the release of Metamorphosis. To date, it has been certified double platinum in the United States and five-times platinum in Canada.

Background
Duff said of All Access Pass, "This All Access Pass really shows the fun we had, and of course, the hard work that went into making my album Metamorphosis. [...] This DVD is very personal, as it gives an up-close look at my exciting and inspiring musical journey over the last two years."

Content
All Access Pass features Duff's music videos for "So Yesterday", "Why Not" and "I Can't Wait", with videos documenting the making of the two former videos and Metamorphosis. The DVD also features Duff performing the songs "So Yesterday" and "Little Voice" at Sessions@AOL, a collection of photos and home videos of Duff, and a biography. The DVD also features a hidden remix video of "I Can't Wait".

Track listing

Credits and personnel
Maria Kleinman – executive producer
Virgil P. Thompson – director, producer
Tess Gallagher Thompson – director, producer
Enny Joo – art director, art designer

Certifications

Release history

References

Hilary Duff video albums
2003 video albums
Music video compilation albums
2003 compilation albums
Hollywood Records video albums